Man in the middle may refer to:

Arts and entertainment
 Man in the Middle (film), a 1964 movie
 "Man in the Middle" a song from the 1975 album ABBA by ABBA
 "Man in the Middle" a song on the 2001 album This Is Where I Came In by the Bee Gees
 "Man in the Middle" a song by David Bowie recorded with his band Arnold Corns as a B-side to "Hang On to Yourself" in 1972
 Man In The Middle, a memoir of basketballer John Amaechi

Other uses
 Man-in-the-middle attack, a form of cryptographic attack in computer security

See also
 Middle man (disambiguation)